Alberta Provincial Highway No. 6, commonly referred to as Highway 6, is a north-south highway in southern Alberta, Canada.

Highway 6 is part of the Cowboy Trail between Highway 5 in Waterton Lakes National Park and the Crowsnest Highway, where the Cowboy Trail follows Highway 3 to Highway 22 and continues north.

Route description 

Montana Highway 17 in Glacier National Park becomes Alberta Highway 6 in Waterton Lakes National Park as it crosses the Canada–United States border at Chief Mountain. Generally travelling in a north direction from Chief Mountain, the highway provides access to the Hamlet of Waterton Park via Highway 5, and passes through the Hamlet of Twin Butte and the Town of Pincher Creek.  Highway 6 ends at Highway 3 north of Pincher Creek.

Major intersections 
The following is a list of major intersections along Alberta Highway 6 from south to north.

References

External links 

The Cowboy Trail's official webpage

006